Karlheinz is a German given name, composed of Karl and Heinz. Notable people with that name include:

 Karlheinz Böhm (1928–2014), Austrian actor
 Karlheinz Brandenburg (born 1954), audio engineer
 Karlheinz Deschner (born 1924), German agnostic
 Karlheinz Essl (born 1960), Austrian composer, performer, sound artist, improviser and composition teacher
 Karlheinz Förster (born 1958), former German football player
 Karlheinz Hackl (born 1949), Austrian actor
 Karlheinz Kaske (1928–1998), German manager and CEO of the Siemens AG
 Karlheinz Klotz (born 1950), West German athlete
 Karlheinz Martin (1886–1948), German stage and film director
 Karlheinz Oswald (born 1958), German sculptor
 Karlheinz Pflipsen (born 1970), retired German soccer player
 Karlheinz Schreiber (born 1934), German-born lobbyist, fundraiser, arms dealer and businessman
 Karlheinz Stockhausen (1928–2007), German composer
 Karlheinz Zöller (1928–2005), German flutist

See also
 Karl-Heinz
 

German masculine given names

de:Karlheinz